Scythris meanderis is a moth of the family Scythrididae. It was described by Bengt Å. Bengtsson in 1997. It is found in France.

Etymology
The species name refers to the curious feature of the bulbus ejaculatorius.

References

meanderis
Moths described in 1997